Nestor is, apart from a given name, also found as a surname borne by Irish and Estonians.

In Ireland, it was derived as a shortened form of Mac Girr an Adhastair, meaning son of the short man of the bridle. It was sometimes shortened to Mac an Adhastair. The surname is most common in County Galway and County Clare. The clan were natives of Corcomroe in the latter county, which in the Middle Ages formed the north-westernmost territory of the kingdom of Thomond. The Mac Girr an Adhastair were associated with the local lords, the Ó Lochlainn family.

People with the surname 
 Agnes Nestor, (1880-1948), American labor leader and social reformer
 Daniel Nestor, (born 1972), Canadian grand slam winning tennis player
 Eddie Nestor, (born 1964) broadcaster and comedian
 Eiki Nestor, (born 1953), Estonian politician
 Ion Nestor (1905-1974), Romanian archaeologist
 Kelly Nestor, (born 1968), Australian newsreader
 Pam Nestor, (born 1948), lyricist and singer

See also 
Nestorović, Serbian surname

References
 The Surnames of Ireland, Edward MacLysaght, Dublin, 1978

Irish families
Surnames of Irish origin